Prozis is an internet-based Portuguese brand that pertains to the Prozis.group and is active in the sports nutrition sector. The company has operational headquarters in Esposende and for tax purposes is headquartered in Madeira Island’s special economic zone. Prozis was founded in 2007 by Miguel Milhão. In 2015, it employed over 230 people and had a revenue of more than 45 million euros. By 2016, It already was one of the biggest sports nutrition online stores in Europe, with over 800,000 registered and active customers across more than 100 markets. Besides selling sports supplements online and in large supermarket chains (like Continente in Portugal), it also produces them on a large scale at its production facility in Póvoa de Lanhoso, in which an amount of 5 million euros was invested. Its research and development center is located in Maia.

Partnerships

Prozis is a partner of the ATRP (Associação de Trail Running de Portugal, the Portuguese Trail Running Association) and became a sponsor of the Portuguese Trail Running Championships as of 2016, as a naming partner. The championships are made up of four competitions, of which three are national championships and one is the Portuguese Cup. In turn, these competitions are divided over 24 events, and over 100,000 athletes are expected to participate. In this discipline only, Prozis already invested approximately 1 million euros.

Prozis is also the official nutrition supplier of European football clubs such as Valencia CF in Spain, AS Monaco FC in France, AS Roma and FC Internazionale in Italy, and several clubs in Portugal: Futebol Clube do Porto, Sport Lisboa e Benfica, Sporting Clube de Portugal, Sporting Clube de Braga, Vitória Sport Clube, Futebol Clube Paços de Ferreira, Rio Ave F.C., Grupo Desportivo de Chaves, Sporting Clube Olhanense, Clube Desportivo das Aves, S.C. Freamunde, Varzim Sport Club, Vitória Futebol Clube (Setúbal), Futebol Clube Famalicão and Académica. It also sponsors the sports careers of Portuguese surfers such as António Rodrigues, Carol Henrique and Miguel Blanco.

Since January 2017 Prozis is the official nutrition supplier of Lega Basket Serie A (LBA) and the title-sponsor for the 2017 Italian Supercup.

Prozis also expanded into eSports by partnering with Bluejays Sports, a German eSports organization, in July 2018.

Awards and recognition
Prozis was one of the brands that received, in Portugal, the "Escolha do Consumidor 2016" (Consumer's Choice) award in the area of health and well-being, more specifically in the category "Sports Supplements". For its success in exports, Prozis was also awarded the "Prémio Exportadora Revelação" (Exports Revelation Award), destined to distinguish and promote the success of companies that strive for export and international business. This prize was an initiative of Novo Banco and Jornal de Negócios in a partnership with IGNIOS, who together created the 2016 edition of the Export and Internationalization awards.

Controversies 
In June 2022, after the United States Supreme Court ruled that the federation's constitution does not confer the right to abortion, Miguel Milhão, founder of Prozis, living in the US, welcomed the decision, writing the following, on LinkedIn: "It looks like unborn babies have regained their rights in the US! Nature is healing!" This post generated outrage on social media in Portugal and was featured on several Portuguese websites.

External links
 Official site.

References

Diets
Dietary supplements
Sports nutrition